The Crimean Bridge, also called Kerch Strait Bridge or Kerch Bridge, is a pair of parallel bridges, one for a four-lane road and one for a double-track railway, spanning the Kerch Strait between the Taman Peninsula of Krasnodar Krai in Russia and the Kerch Peninsula of Crimea.

In January 2015, the multibillion-dollar construction contract for the bridge was awarded to Arkady Rotenberg's Stroygazmontazh. Construction began
in February 2016. The road bridge was inaugurated by Russian President Vladimir Putin on 15 May 2018. It opened for cars on 16 May and for trucks on 1 October. The rail bridge was inaugurated on 23 December 2019 and the first scheduled passenger train crossed the bridge two days later. The bridge was opened for freight trains on 30 June 2020. A record amount of traffic, totaling 36,393 cars, was recorded on 15 August 2020.

The bridge was named the "Crimean Bridge" after an online vote in December 2017, while "Kerch Bridge" and "Reunification Bridge" were the second and third most popular choices, respectively.

On 8 October 2022, an explosion occurred on the roadway leading from Russia to Crimea, causing parts of the road bridge to collapse and starting a large fire on the rail bridge, with repairs ordered to be completed by the end of July 2023. The repairs on the road bridge were completed ahead of schedule and it was fully re-opened on 23 February 2023.

History

Pre-annexation proposals and attempts

Kerch railway bridge 

Proposals to build a bridge across the Kerch Strait were considered from the early 20th century onward.

During World War II the German Organisation Todt built a ropeway over the strait. Finished in June 1943, it had daily capacity of 1,000 tonnes. Construction of a combined road and railway bridge started in April 1943, but before it was finished, retreating German troops blew up the completed parts of the bridge and destroyed the ropeway.

In 1944, the Soviet Union constructed a  railway bridge across the strait. This bridge, not designed as permanent, was marred by design and construction errors, and was destroyed by flowing ice in February 1945. A proposal to repair it was quickly dismissed and the remnants of the bridge were dismantled, with permanent bridge designs envisaged instead.

Soviet proposals 

In 1949 the Soviet government ordered the construction of a  two-tier combined road-rail bridge (two road lanes on the upper tier and two rail tracks on the lower tier) with 40 m clearance below, connecting Yeni-Kale with Chushka Spit, but in 1950 the construction was halted and a ferry line was created instead.

A different version of the fixed link, the Kerch waterworks project («Керченский гидроузел») was developed since the mid-1960s, proposing a system of dams and bridges across the strait. The project was not implemented due to a lack of funding and the collapse of the USSR.

Negotiations between Ukrainian and Russian governments 
Although the idea of an international bridge linking Ukraine and Russia survived the 1991 dissolution of the Soviet Union, the two countries failed to finalize the project. Former Moscow mayor Yury Luzhkov was a vocal advocate for a highway bridge across the strait, expressing hope that it would bring the Crimeans closer to Russia, both economically and symbolically. Similar hopes were expressed by pro-Russian authorities in Crimea, who hoped that the bridge would contribute to either a "revival of the Silk Road" or to a multinational road along the Black Sea coast.

Construction of the bridge was reconsidered by the Cabinet of Ministers of Ukraine in 2006, and the then-Transport Minister of Ukraine Mykola Rudkovsky stated that he expected the bridge to be a "net positive for Crimea" as it would allow "every tourist visiting Russian Caucasus to visit Crimea as well". The issue was discussed by prime ministers of both countries in 2008, and a Transport Strategy of Russia, adopted in that year, envisaged the construction of the Kerch Strait bridge as a high priority issue for the development of the Southern Federal District's transport infrastructure in the period 2016–2030, with design to be created by 2015.

In 2010, Ukrainian President Viktor Yanukovych and Russian President Dmitry Medvedev signed an agreement to build a bridge across the Kerch Strait, and Russia and Ukraine signed a memorandum of mutual understanding on the construction of the bridge on 26 November 2010. A 2011 study by the Ukrainian government announced preliminary preference for a route between Cape Fonar and Cape Maly Kut.

The shelving of the Ukraine–European Union Association Agreement in November 2013 led to increased interest in the construction of a bridge between Crimea and the Taman Peninsula of Russia, and an agreement on the construction of that bridge was signed as a part of the 17 December 2013 Ukrainian–Russian action plan. In late January 2014, the Ukrainian and Russian governments decided that a new joint Ukrainian–Russian company would be commissioned to handle the construction of the bridge, while the Russian state enterprise Russian Highways (Avtodor) would become responsible for the bridge in the long term. 

It was decided a special working group would determine the location and set the technical parameters. The Ministry of Economic Development and Trade of Ukraine estimated that construction would take five years and cost between $1.5 and $3 billion. In early February 2014, Russian Highways (Avtodor) was instructed by the First Deputy Prime Minister of Russia to work on a feasibility study to be published in 2015.

In the following months, as relations between Ukraine and Russia deteriorated, bilateral negotiations over the bridge collapsed, yet Russia claimed that it expected the December 2013 deals to be honored, and on 3 March prime minister Dmitry Medvedev signed a governmental decree to create a subsidiary of Avtodor to oversee the project. A contest for the engineering survey of the bridge project was announced by that subsidiary on 18 March, but by that time the premise of the contest, which still referred to 2013 agreements, was already outdated. In April 2014, following Russian annexation of Crimea the Ukrainian government gave Russia six months' notice of its withdrawal from the now-defunct bilateral Kerch Bridge agreement.

After 2014 annexation and start of construction 

Following the Russian annexation of Crimea in March 2014 amid a sharp deterioration in Ukrainian-Russian relations, Russia declared it would unilaterally build the Kerch Strait bridge to connect the Russian mainland with the annexed Ukrainian peninsula. The project was strategic, an instrumental part of Russian plans to integrate the newly annexed territory into Russia. The project aims to shift Crimean dependence on Ukraine and reduce Kyiv's leverage, remove Moscow's reliance upon inadequate sea and air links for supplying the peninsula, and allow Russia to independently supply Crimea, whose economy has become dependent upon significant subsidies from Moscow. The bridge has a symbolic purpose: it is meant to show Russia's resolve to hold Crimea, and as a "physical" attachment of Crimea to Russian territory.

The announcement that Russia would build a road-rail bridge over the strait was made by the Russian President Vladimir Putin on 19 March 2014, just one day after Russia officially claimed Crimea. In January 2015, the contract for construction of the bridge was awarded to the SGM Group, whose owner Arkady Rotenberg (reportedly a close personal friend of Putin) was internationally sanctioned in response to the Russian military's involvement in Ukraine. SGM typically constructed pipelines and had no experience building bridges, according to BBC News.

The construction of the Kerch Bridge took place without Ukraine's consent. The Ukrainian government has actively condemned Russian construction of the bridge as illegal because Ukraine, "as a coastal state with regard to the Crimean Peninsula", did not give its consent to such construction, and called on Russia to demolish "those parts of that structure located within temporarily occupied Ukrainian territory". Sanctions were introduced by the United States and the European Union against companies involved in the construction. 

Since December 2018 the United Nations General Assembly has repeatedly condemned the construction and opening of the bridge as "facilitating the further militarization of Crimea" and "restricting the size of ships that can reach the Ukrainian ports on the Azov coast". Russia, on the other hand, asserted that it "shall not ask for anybody's permission to build transport infrastructure for the sake of the population of Russian regions".

Following the Russian invasion of Ukraine in February 2022, Ukrainian plans and calls for the "destruction" of the bridge have risen, bringing criticism and talks of guaranteed protection of the bridge from Dmitry Peskov, the Kremlin Press Secretary.

2022 explosion 

On 8 October 2022 a major explosion occurred on the bridge, causing portions of the Crimea-bound road segment to collapse and causing several oil tanker wagons on the rail section to catch fire. Vladimir Konstantinov, Chairman of the State Council of Crimea, attributed the explosion to a Ukrainian attack. Limited traffic resumed on the remaining lines shortly afterwards. Russian authorities ordered repairs to be complete by July 2023.

On 6 January 2023, TASS reported that the first two spans of the left side of the Crimean Bridge’s automobile part leading from the peninsula would be installed that month, with two more to be installed in February, the Federal Road Agency (Rosavtodor) said in a message.

The road bridge was fully re-opened on 23 February 2023.

Design

After the annexation, Russian officials looked at various options for connecting Crimea to the Russian mainland, including a tunnel, but eventually settled on a bridge.

The bridge spans the Strait of Kerch between the Taman Peninsula of Krasnodar Krai and the Kerch Peninsula of Crimea. 

The Russian government's draft resolution of 1 September 2014 required the bridge to have four lanes of vehicle traffic and a double-track railway. 

An official video from October 2015 contained a CGI concept of the bridge design, annotated with various measurements. It showed a four-lane, flat deck highway bridge running parallel with the separate two-track railway.

The final concept was a major change from the initial project considered in late 2014, which had envisaged construction of two bridge links (parallel road and rail bridges between the Taman Peninsula and the Tuzla Spit and a double deck road-rail bridge between Tuzla Island and the Kerch Peninsula) and a causeway on Tuzla Spit. This design was scrapped, the causeway being deemed too risky to rely on given the instability of the Tuzla Spit. 

The official reason for abandonment of a double deck bridge in favor of two continuous parallel structures was that the latter solution allows for less massive spans and for simultaneous construction of both bridges (rather than having to construct one level of bridge first before starting the second one), an important consideration given demands by the Russian government that road and rail links be operational quickly. The "Tuzla route" was preferred over shorter variants (starting at Chushka Spit), in particular because doing otherwise would have interfered with the still operational ferry line, to the effect of worsening transport communications between Russia and Crimea.

The bridge was built by Stroygazmontazh Ltd (SGM), which had never before built a major bridge. Because of the risk of sanctions, no international insurance company was willing to underwrite the potential $3 billion loss. It was insured instead by a small Crimean company.

The geology of the Kerch Strait is difficult: it has a tectonic fault, and the bedrock is covered by a  layer of silt. About 70 mud volcanoes have been found in the area of the strait. More than 7,000 piles support the bridges; these piles have been driven up to  beneath the water surface. Some of the piles are at an angle to make the structure more stable during earthquakes.

Some experts expressed doubts that the construction was safe, given the tectonic and sea current conditions in the strait.

Construction

Preliminary work on the bridge began in May 2015. More than 200 bombs and a few airplanes (including an Ilyushin Il-2 and a Curtiss P-40 Kittyhawk) from the World War II era were found in the area during pre-construction clearance. Three temporary bridges were built, to facilitate access (independent of weather and currents) for main construction. By October 2015, the first of the temporary bridges had been constructed, connecting Tuzla Island and Taman Peninsula.

Main construction started in February 2016. The first piles were installed in early 2016, and in April 2016 the first pillar of the road bridge was constructed. The foundations of the road bridge were completed in August 2017. The two shipping channel arches (over the Kerch–Yenikale Canal) were lifted into position in August and October that year.

In October 2017, National Guard of Russia Director Viktor Zolotov announced the formation of a new "maritime brigade", intended to protect the bridge as part of Russia's Southern Military District. In December 2017 all road pillars and spans were completed, by April 2018 asphalt concrete was laid onto the road bridge, and after some examination the road bridge was deemed ready for operation.

On 15 May 2018, the road bridge was officially unveiled. President Vladimir Putin led a convoy of trucks, driving one himself, across the bridge in an inauguration ceremony. The bridge was opened for non-truck vehicle traffic on 16 May 2018 and for trucks on 1 October.

The construction of the rail bridge continued. In June 2018 pile installation was finished, and in July 2018 deployment of the rail tracks started.

In October 2018, the Russian Taman Road Administration reported that when one of the railway spans was being lowered into place, it tilted and fell into the sea. This occurred in the sea section between Tuzla Spit and Tuzla Island. In November 2018 the installation of the railway pillars was completed.

On 24 March 2019 the bridge's press center reported completion of construction of railway spans, and on 18 July it reported completion of the bridge's rail tracks. In October 2019, the opening for freight trains was postponed until 2020, the official cause was a delay in the construction of the connecting railroad caused by the discovery of an ancient site on the Kerch Peninsula. Sale of train tickets across the Kerch Strait started in November 2019. On 18 December 2019 the rail bridge was deemed ready for operation, and President Putin formally opened the bridge on 23 December. The first scheduled passenger train crossed the bridge on 25 December 2019, while the bridge was opened for freight trains on 30 June 2020.

The rail bridge design provides the ability to install an overhead railway electrification system "whenever such decision will be made", requiring no rebuilding of the bridge's structures. Pending electrification, the rail bridge is served by diesel locomotives.

Operation and impact

On Crimea and Russia 

The road bridge, opened in 2018, quickly overtook the Kerch Strait ferry as a preferred route of communication between Crimea and Russia. In its first 12 hours of operation the bridge broke the traffic record of the ferry, which had been established in August 2017. After the bridge was opened for trucks in October 2018, truck transportation via the ferry virtually ceased. After the first full year of operation (May 2018 – May 2019) the road bridge had served three times more traffic than the Kerch Strait ferry had served in the whole of 2017. 

Since the road bridge is free of charge, in contrast to the ferry, it is claimed that users of the bridge saved more than 16 billion rubles. The bridge is said to have contributed to an increase of the number of tourists visiting the Crimea, with bridge traffic peaking in the summer months – on 5 August 2018 the bridge broke a single-day record for car traffic, with 32,000 vehicles crossing the span, followed by over 33,000 vehicles on 12 August that year and over 35,000 a year later. The long roadway with few diversions occasionally becomes congested, with long traffic queues.

A fall in the price of retail goods in Crimea, which was expected to occur after the opening of the road bridge, did not happen. According to the local Russian administration, this situation persists because large retail groups are not operating in Crimea due to either risk of being sanctioned or because they deem Crimea a "logistic dead end", although there were expectations that the opening of the rail bridge would eventually contribute to a decrease in price of certain goods.

On Ukraine 

The Russian bridge crosses the sole access point for ships travelling to and from Ukraine's eastern port cities, including Mariupol and Berdiansk through which Ukraine exported steel and agricultural products. Following completion of the bridge various restrictions were imposed on Ukrainian shipping which affect their operating costs, which Ukraine and others alleged was part of a creeping hybrid blockade of Ukrainian ports in the Azov Sea.

These restrictions, including Russian inspections of ships, had risen sharply since the bridge opened in May 2018, some being forced to wait for three days before being allowed through. Additionally, due to the height limits of the main span of the bridge ( above sea level) the Ukrainian maritime authority said many ships are too big to pass safely under the bridge. The bulk carrier Copan (deadweight tonnage 17,777 tons) solved this problem by cutting off the top of her mast. On 26 October 2018 The Globe and Mail, citing Ukrainian sources, reported that the bridge had reduced Ukrainian shipping from its Sea of Azov ports by about 25%. 

In November 2018 the area near the bridge became the site of the Kerch Strait incident, in which the Russian navy claimed that three Ukrainian vessels entered Russian territorial waters. Russian forces seized the vessels and arrested their crews. During this time, passage through the Strait was blocked by a large cargo ship, placed under the bridge to prevent passage of other craft. In response, Ukraine declared martial law in some regions of the country for 30 days.

Archaeology 

Part of a large Greek terracotta statue was found at the Crimean Bridge construction site, during underwater digging near the Ak-Burun Cape. According to archaeologists, this is a unique finding, since it is the first of its kind found in the northern Black Sea area.

In popular culture 
Russian film director Tigran Keosayan made a romantic comedy film about the construction of the bridge called The Crimean Bridge. Made with Love!. It was officially released in cinemas in Russia on 1 November 2018.

Gallery

Explanatory notes

References

Further reading

External links 

 Security cam video of bridge explosion, 8 October 2022.

2018 establishments in Russia
2018 establishments in Ukraine
2019 establishments in Russia
2019 establishments in Ukraine
Bridges completed in 2018
Bridges completed in 2019
Buildings and structures in Kerch
Buildings and structures in Krasnodar Krai
Cross-sea bridges in Europe
Kerch Strait
Rail transport in Krasnodar Krai
Railway bridges in Russia
Railway bridges in Ukraine
Road bridges in Russia
Road bridges in Ukraine
Russia–Ukraine border crossings
Transport in Crimea
Transport in Krasnodar Krai